Seenroot was a South Korean musical duo, signed under Kakao M's indie sub-label Mun Hwa In. The pair's debut mini-album was released in 2015. The record's lead single "Sweet Heart" did not see success until two years after its release, when a broadcast jockey sang the song in midst of live streaming and became a viral video. It led the song to peak at number 13 on the national Gaon Digital Chart, where it sold nearly 1.3 million downloads by the end of 2017.

History
Originally majoring in fashion design, Shin Hyun-hee learned to play acoustic guitar after watching tutorials on the online video website YouTube. She posted videos on the platform, which led her to perform in Daegu where she met Kim Root. A jazz major, Kim wanted to form a jazz ensemble at the time. He felt that Shin's voice was "incredibly good", and decided to form a band with her.

Seenroot's first release "Comfortable Song" was included on the compilation album Between the Cafes Vol.2 (2013), which featured songs from new acoustic indie music acts. The duo released its debut single "Cap Song" on April 4, 2014. The pair participated in over 200 performances and festivals for the following ten months. Seenroot released its debut self-titled mini-album on February 26, 2015. Writing for newspaper No Cut News, Kim Hyeon-shik described the lead single "Sweet Heart" as "cheerful and fresh", noting its "peculiar attraction". The band released its first studio album Seenroot's Wonderland on June 15, 2016.

In January 2017, AfreecaTV broadcast jockey Kkotnim sang "Sweet Heart" while live streaming. The clip was shared across social media and became a viral video, which fueled the track to climb South Korean online music stores two years after its initial release. The song entered the country's national singles chart at number 34 and peaked at number 13. The duo's mini-album The Color of Seenroot was released on July 11, 2018.

Seenroot disbanded in 2019 following the expiration of their contracts.

Members
Adapted from D Ocean Music.
 Shin Hyun-hee – vocals, guitar
 Kim Root – bass, chorus

Discography

Albums

Discography

Extended plays

Singles

As lead artist

Guest appearances

Soundtrack appearances

References

External links
 

Kakao M artists
South Korean folk rock groups
Musical groups established in 2013
Musical groups disestablished in 2019
Musical groups from Seoul
South Korean musical duos
Male–female musical duos
2013 establishments in South Korea